Thomas F. Bloom is a mathematician, who is a Royal Society University Research Fellow at the University of Oxford.  He works in arithmetic combinatorics and analytic number theory.

Education and career 
Thomas did his undergraduate degree in Mathematics and Philosophy at Merton College, Oxford. He then went on to do his PhD in mathematics at the University of Bristol under the supervision of Trevor Wooley. After finishing his PhD, he was a Heilbronn Research Fellow at the University of Bristol. In 2018, he became a postdoctoral research fellow at the University of Cambridge with Timothy Gowers. In 2021, he joined the University of Oxford as a Research Fellow.

Research 
In July 2020, Bloom and Sisask proved that any set such that  diverges must contain arithmetic progressions of length 3. This is the first non-trivial case of a conjecture of Erdős postulating that any such set must in fact contain arbitrarily long arithmetic progressions.

In December 2021, he proved  that any set  of positive upper density contains a finite  such that . This answered a question of Erdős and Graham.

References 

Year of birth missing (living people)
Living people
Royal Society University Research Fellows
British mathematicians
Alumni of Merton College, Oxford
Alumni of the University of Bristol